McInnis is a surname originating from the Isle of Skye. Notable people with the surname include:

Brandon McInnis, American voice actor
David Lee McInnis (born 1973), American actor
Evon McInnis (born 1980), Jamaican cricketer
James McInnis (1855–1917), Prince Edward Island politician
Jan McInnis, American stand-up comedian
Jeff McInnis (born 1974), American basketball player
John K. McInnis (1854–1923), Canadian educator and politician
John McInnis (c. 1880 – 1972), Canadian businessman and politician
John McInnis (1950–2003), Canadian politician
Marty McInnis (born 1970), American ice hockey player
Maurie McInnis (born 1966), American academic
Nadine McInnis, Canadian writer
Scott McInnis (born 1953), American lawyer and politician
Stanley McInnis (1865–1907), Canadian politician
Stuffy McInnis (1890–1960), American baseball player

See also
McInnis Canyons National Conservation Area, protected area in the United States
John McInnis Jr. Secondary School, Canadian high school

External links 
 McInnis Family Crest

Scottish surnames